Antônio Silvestre (born 17 April 1961) is a Brazilian cyclist. He competed at the 1980 Summer Olympics and the 1988 Summer Olympics.

References

External links
 

1961 births
Living people
Brazilian male cyclists
Brazilian track cyclists
Olympic cyclists of Brazil
Cyclists at the 1980 Summer Olympics
Cyclists at the 1988 Summer Olympics
Place of birth missing (living people)
Pan American Games medalists in cycling
20th-century Brazilian people
21st-century Brazilian people
Pan American Games bronze medalists for Brazil
Medalists at the 1987 Pan American Games